Robert William Huxley, known as Robb Huxley (born 4 December 1945) is a British vocalist, guitarist and musician. He is widely regarded as a pioneer of Israeli rock due to his work in Israel in the 1960s and 1970s with his band, The Churchills, and with prominent Israeli artists such as Arik Einstein.

Early life
Huxley was born in Gloucester, England and educated at Sir Thomas Rich’s Grammar School. After leaving school in 1962, he joined a local band, the Vendettas, as vocalist in 1963.

Professional career
After the Vendettas, Huxley moved on to join the Whirlwinds as lead singer under the name "Robb Gayle".

After a recording audition with Joe Meek, the Whirlwinds changed their name to the Saxons and dyed their hair blond. While still semi-pro they released a single through Joe Meek in 1965; an instrumental written by Pete Holder and Robb Huxley titled "Saxon Warcry".

In December 1965, Joe Meek summoned the Saxons to London to work professionally as his house band, renamed The Tornados. They were also known as the New Tornados. During their short association with Joe Meek, they put out two singles. “Pop-Art Goes Mozart” / “Too Much in Love to Hear” and “Is that a Ship I Hear” / “Do You Come Here Often”. Both singles were released in 1966. Nowadays “Do you Come Here Often” is recognized as being the first ever openly “gay” song to be released on record.

Almost a year after Joe Meek’s death in a shooting incident at his Holloway Road studio, with only Robb Huxley and Dave Watts remaining from the original line up, the Tornados left for a tour of Israel.

Early in February 1968 in Tel-Aviv, the Tornados disbanded, which ended Joe Meek’s succession of Tornados.

In Israel

Huxley remained in Israel and played with a three piece group called Purple Ass Baboon for a short time. The group was probably the first ever “punk” style band to play in Israel.

Huxley met up with Stan Solomon, Canadian singer with the Israeli band The Churchills and was invited to join the band when two members were subscripted into the Israeli army.

Huxley and Solomon went on to write the music for the Churchills’ only album, which was written in part for the Israeli film, A Woman’s Case. The vinyl album is acclaimed today to be the rarest psychedelic record in the world, and is also recognized for its musical content.

Huxley went on to write for Israeli singers, the most prominent being Arik Einstein who had a hit “Akhinoam Lo Yoda'at" ("Akhinoam Doesn't Know", eng. "When You’re Gone") which Huxley had written for the Churchills.

Huxley and Einstein collaborated on an album of children’s songs, with melodies written by Huxley and lyrics by Einstein.

After Stan Solomon quit the Churchills in 1969, the band became Arik Einstein’s backing band. They were also joined by singer Danny Shoshan, a former bass player and vocalist from the Lions.

In 1970, they recorded an album, Junkies, Monkeys and Donkeys at Red Bus Records in London, with music written by Huxley and Shoshan and changed their name to Jericho Jones. They went on to record a second album under the name of Jericho, again with Huxley / Shoshan compositions.

In 1972, bass player Miki Gavrielov and drummer Ami Trebich returned to Israel. Shoshan took over the bass with Huxley and Haim Romano on guitars. They took on British drummer Chris Perry. They put out two singles, but after a tour of South Africa in 1973, Jericho disbanded due to management, personal and record label problems.

Huxley's work in Israel, particularly with the Churchills and with Einstein, made him become widely regarded as one of the pioneers of Israeli rock.

Huxley moved to Miami in 1974, where he still lives with his Israeli wife.

External links
 Official Site

1945 births
Living people
English male singers
People from Gloucester
Beat musicians
The Tornados members